The Skeptic's Toolbox is an annual four-day workshop devoted to scientific skepticism. It was formed by psychologist and now-retired University of Oregon professor Ray Hyman, has been held every August since 1992, and is sponsored by the Committee for Skeptical Inquiry. The workshop focuses on educating people to be better critical thinkers, and involves a central theme. The attendees are broken up into groups and given tasks that they must work on together and whose results they must present in front of the entire group on the last day.

History
Hyman created the Skeptic's Toolbox in 1989 to teach people how to be better skeptics.  He tells James Underdown that "we were putting out more fires by skeptics than by believers... they were going overboard". The first toolbox was in Buffalo, NY with himself, James Alcock and Steve Shaw (now called Banachek).  With the exception of one year when the toolbox was held in Boulder, Colorado, the toolbox has been held at the University of Oregon in Eugene.
In general, the faculty likes to keep the numbers at about 90 in order to give everyone personalized attention, and allow everyone the chance to participate.  At the 1993 Toolbox, "More than a hundred people participated, from 19 states, Canada, and Hong Kong, and their enthusiasm continued to grow with each passing day, ending on the fifth day with what appeared to be a unanimous 'If only we had more time!'".

In 1997 Skeptical Inquirer announced that CFI would begin offering an academic certificate for students in a three-year program. Students needed to complete 30 units in academic work as well as in workshops. The two certificates offered were Humanistic Studies and Science and the Paranormal, attending The Skeptic's Toolbox would satisfy one of the workshop requirements.

Methodology and focus
While critical thinking is the overall focus, lectures designed around the theme focus on the specialties of the faculty.  A reporter for the Register-Guard attended the 2003 toolbox and wrote of his experience hearing lectures on post traumatic stress syndrome, graphology, repressed memory court cases, communication with the dead, healing through prayer, traditional Chinese medicine and psychic dogs.  All that and Jerry Andrus's display of optical illusions too. The goal of the Toolbox is to "help skeptics add to their arsenal of tools and techniques with which to both guard against deception and properly evaluate paranormal claims".  Learning how to communicate with believers is also considered important: "Skeptics search for truths, believers tend to want validation of their experiences".

Getting the skeptical message across to believers was a focus at the 1993 event. Faculty felt that non-skeptics might be more receptive if attendees understood how they were perceived by others.  "Many people view skeptics as die-hard cynics and debunkers, even as enemies of free speech. Nonskeptics often hear only the "COP" in CSICOP".

In 2010, interviewed by D. J. Grothe, Hyman explained, "give people the tools to think, help them to become better thinkers". Mentalist Bob Fellows performed at the second conference and told the audience, "The effect (of a magic trick) on audiences who (believe the trick is real magic) can be enormously powerful.  And when deceit is involved, they can be potentially harmful as well".  Hyman felt that it was necessary to teach attendees with a "case-based approach... concrete examples as a first step toward extracting broad examples... (giving) the benefit of context" to the learning experience.

Faculty
Loren Pankratz – A founding faculty member of the Skeptic's Toolbox, Pankratz explained to Harriet Hall,  about the beginnings of the Toolbox, "Ray Hyman, Jerry Andrus and I were meeting together once a month or so and we decided that maybe the three of us could put a Toolbox together."

Barry Beyerstein – "One of the many enjoyable tasks I undertake for CSICOP is to lecture in Ray Hyman's annual summer workshop at the University of Oregon.  Not only is it the towering presence of Ray himself, and the joy of observing the sheer brainpower of my fellow faculty at work, it is also the people, literally from around the world, who enroll in this and other CSICOP functions that keep me from suffering that occupational hazard 'skeptic's burnout.'  They are a remarkable lot, genuinely nice people committed to critical thinking and leaving the place a bit better than they found it.  They make me very pleased that my fate was to become a skeptical inquirer."

Harriet Hall – Prior to attending the Toolbox as a student, Hall had been a "passive skeptic", "I hadn't done any writing... Ray Hyman and Wally Sampson encouraged me to try my hand at writing, one thing led to another and now I'm on the faculty of the Skeptic's Toolbox."

Lindsay Beyerstein – She started attending the Skeptic's Toolbox when she was 14; her father Barry Beyerstein strongly influenced her involvement in the skeptical movement. "It's sorta funny, the skeptics' movement is now finally old enough, it's like Scientology, we have second gen!" She recounts, "I was always involved with my Dad in skeptical meetings... "We would have family newsletter-stuffing nights (for the BC Skeptics)." instead of hiring babysitters her father would take Lindsay to his media interviews.  "Does Satanic music cause suicide?  Out-of-body experiences... it was always something new and different."

James Alcock – "Ray and I and a magician by the name of Steve Shaw, now known as Banachek did the very first Toolbox in Buffalo... a little while later Ray asked me if I could come out here to this group." Ray stated "It took a long while to get Jim out here, but finally we managed it."

Other

Gallery of photos

References 

Skeptic organizations in the United States
Skeptic conferences
Scientific skepticism
Annual events in Eugene, Oregon
Recurring events established in 1989